Arno Wallaard (13 October 1979 in Noordeloos – 28 February 2006 in Noordeloos) was a Dutch cyclist. 
He died on 28 February 2006, after feeling sick coming home from training. The cycling race Omloop Alblasserwaard, which Wallaard won in 1999, was renamed the Arno Wallaard Memorial in honor of him.

Major results

1999
 1st Omloop Alblasserwaard
2001
 1st  Road race, National Under-23 Road Championships
 1st Stage 3 Thüringen Rundfahrt der U23
 1st Stage 2 Transalsace
 10th Road race, UEC European Under-23 Road Championships
2002
 1st Stage 3 Ronde van Antwerpen
 3rd Ronde van Overijssel
2003
 10th Overall Olympia's Tour
2004
 1st Stage 4 Olympia's Tour
 1st Profronde van Fryslan (with 21 others)
 3rd Ster van Zwolle
 7th Ronde van Noord-Holland
 7th Ronde van Midden-Nederland
 8th ZLM Tour
2005
 1st Ronde van Overijssel
 2nd Ronde van Midden-Nederland
 2nd Grand Prix Möbel Alvisse
 2nd De Parel van de Veluwe
 3rd Ronde van Vlaams-Brabant

References

1979 births
2006 deaths
Dutch male cyclists
People from Giessenlanden
Cyclists from South Holland
20th-century Dutch people
21st-century Dutch people